Hamish Robert Haynes (born 5 March 1974 in Stalybridge) is an English road racing cyclist. He was British champion in 2006.

Major results

2003
 1st Stage 5 Arden Challenge
2004
 1st Grand Prix Criquielion
2005
 1st Grote 1-MeiPrijs
 1st Stage 2 Tour de Hongrie
2006
 1st  Road race, National Road Championships
2007
 3rd Road race, National Road Championships

External links

1974 births
Living people
English male cyclists
British cycling road race champions
People from Stalybridge